This is a list of schools in Yanqing District, Beijing.

Secondary schools
Note: In China the word 中学 zhōngxué, literally translated as "middle school", refers to any secondary school and differs from the American usage of the term "middle school" to mean specifically a lower secondary school or junior high school. 初中 chū​zhōng is used to refer to a lower secondary school.

 Beijing City Yanqing District National Day School (北京市延庆区十一学校)
 Beijing City Yanqing District Xiangying School (北京市延庆区香营学校)
 Beijing City Yanqing District Yongning School (北京市延庆区永宁学校)
 Beijing City Yanqing District Zhangshanying School (北京市延庆区张山营学校)
 Beijing City Yanqing District No. 1 High School (北京市延庆区第一中学)
 Beijing City Yanqing District No. 2 High School (北京市延庆区第二中学)
 Beijing City Yanqing District No. 3 High School (北京市延庆区第三中学)
 Beijing City Yanqing District No. 4 High School (北京市延庆区第四中学)
 Beijing City Yanqing District No. 5 High School (北京市延庆区第五中学)
 Beijing City Yanqing District No. 8 High School (北京市延庆区第八中学)
 Beijing City Yanqing District No. 1 Vocational School (北京市延庆区第一职业学校)
 Beijing City Yanqing District Badaling High School (北京市延庆区八达岭中学)
 Beijing City Yanqing District Dayushu High School (北京市延庆区大榆树中学)
 Beijing City Yanqing District Jingzhuang High School (北京市延庆区井庄中学)
 Beijing City Yanqing District Kangzhuang High School (北京市延庆区康庄中学)
 Beijing City Yanqing District Liubinbao High School (北京市延庆区刘斌堡中学)
 Beijing City Yanqing District Jiuxian High School (北京市延庆区旧县中学)
 Beijing City Yanqing District Physical Education High School (北京市延庆区体育运动学校)
 Beijing City Yanqing District Shenjiaying High School (北京市延庆区沈家营中学)
 Beijing City Yanqing District Xiatun High School (北京市延庆区下屯中学)
 Beijing City Yanqing District Special Education Center (北京市延庆区特殊教育中心)

Primary schools

References

Yanqing
Schools